The Progress Cup is a football prize (not a tournament) that was awarded by the Russophone "Rabochaya Gazeta" (Kiev) from 1971 until 1991, the collapse of the Soviet Union. 

The prize was given to the Soviet Top League club which made the biggest progress in points from the previous season based on mathematical calculations.

Award holders
 1971 – FC Dynamo Kiev
 1972 – FC Zorya Voroshilovgrad
 1973 – FC Dynamo Moscow
 1974 – FC Chernomorets Odessa
 1975 – FC Shakhtar Donetsk
 1976 (spring) – FC Krylia Sovetov Kuybyshev
 1976 (autumn) – FC Torpedo Moscow
 1977 – FC Shakhtar Donetsk
 1978 – FC Spartak Moscow
 1979 – FC Dinamo Minsk
 1980 – FC Zenit Leningrad
 1981 – FC Dynamo Moscow
 1982 – FC Dinamo Minsk
 1983 – FC Dnipro Dnipropetrovsk
 1984 – FC Dynamo Tbilisi
 1985 – FC Dynamo Kiev
 1986 – FC Dynamo Moscow
 1987 – FC Dnipro Dnipropetrovsk
 1988 – FC Dynamo Kiev
 1989 – FC Chernomorets Odessa
 1990 – FC CSKA Moscow

Performance by club

External links
 Holders of the cup

Soviet football trophies and awards
Soviet Top League
1971 establishments in the Soviet Union
1991 disestablishments in the Soviet Union